Patryk Adamczyk (born 5 January 1994) is a Polish athlete competing in the 400 metres hurdles. He represented his country at the 2016 European Championships reaching the semifinals.

International competitions

Personal bests
Outdoor
400 metres – 47.48 (Siedlce 2016)
400 metres hurdles – 49.72 (Jelenia Góra 2016)
Indoor
400 metres – 46.96 (Toruń 2018)

References

1994 births
Living people
Polish male hurdlers
World Athletics Indoor Championships winners
Universiade medalists in athletics (track and field)
Universiade bronze medalists for Poland
Medalists at the 2019 Summer Universiade
21st-century Polish people